The 1974–75 Yorkshire Football League was the 49th season in the history of the Yorkshire Football League, a football competition in England.

Division One

Division One featured 12 clubs which competed in the previous season, along with four new clubs, promoted from Division Two:
Guiseley
North Ferriby United
Ossett Albion
Thackley

League table

Map

Division Two

Division Two featured eight clubs which competed in the previous season, along with eight new clubs.
Clubs relegated from Division One:
Barton Town
Kiveton Park
Rawmarsh Welfare
Woolley Miners Welfare
Clubs promoted from Division Three:
Bentley Victoria Welfare
Maltby Miners Welfare
Pickering Town
Redfearn National Glass

League table

Map

Division Three

Division Three featured ten clubs which competed in the previous season, along with six new clubs.
Clubs relegated from Division Two:
Brook Sports
Norton Woodseats
Selby Town
Wombwell Sporting Association
Plus:
BSC Parkgate, joined from the Sheffield Association League
York Railway Institute

League table

Map

League Cup

Final

References

1974–75 in English football leagues
Yorkshire Football League